Llane (born Juan David Castaño Montoya on January 20, 1990 in Sabaneta, Colombia) is a Colombian singer, formerly a member of the group Piso 21 and now a solo artist.

Career 

Llane spent 12 years with the group Piso 21, enjoying success in several countries. In February 2019 he announced via YouTube that he was leaving the group to begin a solo career. On October 18, 2019, he released his first solo single, "Más de ti"., and on January 31, 2020, he released the second one, "Amor bailando". Llane also made his live debut as a solo artist at the Megaland 2019 outdoor music concert in Bogota on November 30, 2019.

He will be releasing his debut album titled “Fino” later this year.

Discography

Singles

References 

1990 births
Living people
21st-century Colombian male singers